Cheung Sha is a rural area on the south coast of Lantau Island, New Territories, Hong Kong. Along the South Lantau Road, Cheung Sha is located between Tong Fuk (to the southwest) and San Shek Wan (to the northeast).

The most notable feature of the area is the Cheung Sha Beach, the longest beach in Hong Kong.

History
The South Lantau Road, passing through Cheung Sha, was built in the mid-20th century from Silver Mine Bay to Shek Pik for access to the new reservoir there.

Features
Cheung Sha is rural in character and largely undeveloped.

It is home to two small villages, namely Cheung Sha Ha Tsuen and Cheung Sha Sheung Tsuen. There are also a few low-density private housing developments. Cheung Sha Lower Village and Cheung Sha Upper Village are recognized villages under the New Territories Small House Policy.

The Cheung Sha Beach is the longest beach in Hong Kong. It actually comprises two beaches separated by a rocky outcropping: Lower Cheung Sha Beach and Upper Cheung Sha Beach. On its own, Upper Cheung Sha Beach is still the longest beach in Hong Kong.

The Hong Kong Government has holiday bungalows for government employees at Cheung Sha.

Proposed development

In January 2016, the Lantau Development Advisory Committee (LanDAC) proposed to build spas, resort hotels, and a "wedding centre" at Cheung Sha. The suggestion was part of a wider proposal to undertake major development of Lantau Island, increasing its population from approximately 100,000 to one million.

The proposals were positively received by the government, but decried by various advocacy groups as destructive urban sprawl reliant on more "white elephant" infrastructure projects.

References

External links

 Delineation of area of existing village Cheung Sha Lower Village (South Lantao) for election of resident representative (2019 to 2022)
 Delineation of area of existing village Cheung Sha Upper Village (South Lantao) for election of resident representative (2019 to 2022)

Populated places in Hong Kong
Lantau Island
Islands District